Gălbinași may refer to several places in Romania:

 Gălbinași, Buzău, a commune in Buzău County
 Gălbinași, Călărași, a commune in Călărași County